Sheila Baxter (born 1933) is a Canadian anti-poverty activist who has written several books about poverty and mental illness in Canada.

On September 28th, 2017, Baxter was awarded the governor general sovereign medal for volunteers, for co-foundeding Chez Doris, a shelter for women, that has grown significantly since opening in 1977. Due to her dedicated efforts, many marginalized and vulnerable women have found support and safety.

Life
Baxter became active in the anti-poverty movement in Quebec, Canada in 1970. Baxter also co-founded Chez Doris, a drop-in centre for women living on the streets of Montreal, and has more recently been active in Vancouver, British Columbia as a counsellor and welfare advocate at the Downtown Eastside Women's Centre. Baxter is a poet, educator and author of five books on poverty and homelessness, and is currently active with the Vancouver City-Wide Housing Coalition.

She read at the Vancouver Public Library.

Awards
 VanCity Book Prize 
 Sovereign Medal for Volunteers,

Works
 No Way to Live: Poor Women Speak Out (New Star Press, 1988) (Photos: Lori Gabrielson)
 Under the Viaduct: Homeless in Beautiful B.C. (New Star Press, 1991)
 A Child is Not a Toy: Voices of Children in Poverty (New Star Press, 1993)
 Still Raising Hell: Poverty, Activism and Other True Stories (Press Gang Publishers, 1997)
 Death in a Dumpster: A Passion Play for the Homeless (Lazara Press, 2006)

References

1933 births
Living people
Canadian anti-poverty activists
Canadian non-fiction writers
Canadian women non-fiction writers